The Uniting College for Leadership and Theology located at Brooklyn Park South Australia is a Uniting Church in Australia (UCA) theological college for the education and training of both lay people and those for specified ministries including the diaconate and youth workers. It is a member college of the University of Divinity.

From 1930, staff of the Congregational Union of Australia's Parkin College and the Methodist Church of Australasia's Wesley Theological College lectured students of both institutions. In the 1950s, the Baptist College was founded in Northgate Street, Unley Park and further sharing of staff occurred, although more limited than between Parkin and Wesley. In 1968, Parkin College and Wesley Theological College merged to form Parkin-Wesley College at Wayville, the site of Wesley College.

Later, the South Australian UCA Lay Education Centre was merged in.

Coolamon College was the national UCA agency and provider of distance theological education. In 2003, Coolamon College moved from Brisbane to Adelaide where it joined the Adelaide College of Divinity.

Parkin-Wesley College was renamed Uniting College for Leadership and Theology in January 2009, at this time it took on the distance learning function previously offered through Coolamon College.

Until the end of 2021 it contributed to theological education at The Flinders University of South Australia. It was a constituent college of the Adelaide College of Divinity up to the end of 2022.

People
Reverend Dr. Andrew Dutney was Principal
Reverend Dr. Ian B. Tanner was Director of Lay Education
Reverend Dr. H. D'Arcy Wood was a lecturer at the college

References

Seminaries and theological colleges in Australia
Uniting Church in Australia
Education in Adelaide